Hamilton Creek is a tributary stream of the Columbia River in Skamania County, in the U.S. state of Washington.

History
Hamilton Creek was named after Samuel Milton Hamilton, an early settler.

See also
List of rivers of Washington

References

Rivers of Skamania County, Washington
Rivers of Washington (state)